Feely is a surname. Notable people with the surname include:

 Frank Feely (21st century), Northern Irish politician
 Herta Feely, writer and child safety activist
 Jay Feely (born 1976), American football placekicker
 John J. Feely (1875–1905), American politician
 Orla Feely (born c 1964), Professor of Engineering
 Terence Feely (1928–2000), British screenwriter